Caprasia was an ancient town of Bruttium, placed by the Itineraries on the road from Muranum to Consentia (modern Cosenza), at a distance of 28 miles from the latter city. (Itin. Ant. pp. 105, 110; Tabula Peutingeriana) It is probably the modern Tarsia (in the Province of Cosenza, Calabria, Italy), on the left bank of the Crathis (modern Crati), about the required distance from Cosenza.

References

Bruttium
Pre-Roman cities in Italy